The House of the National Assembly of the Republic of Serbia is the seat of the National Assembly of Serbia. The building is on Nikola Pašić Square in downtown Belgrade, and is a landmark and tourist attraction. Between its completion in 1936 and 2006, it was the seat of the Parliament of Yugoslavia and the Parliament of Serbia and Montenegro.

History

King Peter I built the House of Representatives of the Kingdom of Serbia near the former location of a large Batal mosque. The first plans for the future House of Representatives were drawn up by architect Konstantin Jovanović in 1891, that also designed the National Assembly building of Bulgaria. His plans were slightly revised because of a new state constitution mandating a bicameral (instead of unicameral) legislature. Architect Jovan Ilkić won a 1901 design competition, adhering to Jovanović's basic plan. The cornerstone of the House of Representative was laid in a public 1907 ceremony by King Peter I in the presence of other members of the royal family and senior officials. Construction lasted until 1936, interrupted by the Balkan Wars, World War I, and the Great Depression. The first session in the new house took place on 20 October 1936. 

The  building is designed in neo-baroque style. Its interior, completed in 1938, was designed by Russian architect Nikolai Krasnov. Krasnov designed every detail: chandeliers, lamps, handles, windows, and furniture. His plans were painted in watercolor, rather than a classical technical drawing with pencil and ruler. Lawmakers did not have long to enjoy the newly built House of Representatives. After the 1941 invasion of Yugoslavia and during  World War II, the House of Representatives housed the German high command for southeastern Europe. The building was damaged during the demonstrations on 5 October 2000, and appears on the RSD5,000 banknote. The parliament building was featured in the 2011 film, Coriolanus.

Exterior

The house was originally designed by architect Konstantin Jovanović in 1891, but financial constraints prevented its construction at the time. A new design was proposed by Jovan Ilkić in 1901 after a constitutional amendment and the creation of a bicameral parliament.

Following the formation of the Kingdom of Serbs, Croats and Slovenes in 1918, the parliament was increased and the original design (under construction) deemed inadequate. A modified design was made by Ilkić's son, Pavle, in 1920 and construction resumed until its completion in 1936. A sculpture by Toma Rosandić, Igrali se konji vrani (Play by Black Horses), was installed in front of the building in 1939.

Interior

The building's interior was designed by architect Nikolai Krasnov in academic traditional style. The building has 100 offices, large and small halls, and four committee rooms. The  library, on the first floor, contains over 60,000 books. The building is decorated with 23 frescoes and a number of paintings, sculptures, and other fine artwork.

During the 5 October riots in 2000, 91 pieces of art were stolen from the National Assembly. Thirty-five have been found, but 56 remain missing. The building itself was also damaged.

Construction 
Construction began on 27 August 1907, when the building's cornerstone was laid in the presence of Peter I of Serbia, George, Crown Prince of Serbia, members of parliament and the diplomatic corps. Its charter, sealed in the cornerstone during the ceremony, bore the names of the king, the metropolitan, and chief architect Jovan Ilkić. Construction was overseen by Belgrade contractor Vasa Tešić. It was delayed until the end of World War I, with only the first floor completed. Construction was influenced by the formation of the Kingdom of Yugoslavia, which required the project to be modified. After Ilkić's death in 1917 his son, Ministry of Construction architect Pavle Ilkić, led the project. His duties included making the required changes and completing the original design. Construction continued from 1920 to 1926, when it was again suspended. A decision about the next phase was made after the death of Alexander I of Yugoslavia in 1934, when the contractor became Ministry of Construction chief architect Nikolaj Krasnov (1864–1939). Krasnov's thirty years of experience in public-building design (giving him the titles of Architect of the Russian Imperial Court and "the academician of architecture") led to his invitation to work on important buildings in the Serbian capital, and he provided details of the interior. The National Assembly was dedicated on 18 October 1936 in the presence of Peter II of Yugoslavia, after 29 years of construction. The first governmental session was held two days later, and by the end of the year the building was fully completed.

Architecture 

The building's central risalit is dominated by a portico with a triangular tympanum, above which is a dome with a lantern at the top. Its external design (with rustic green stone from Ripanj for the basement), and the shape of windows and pilasters extending through the two central levels and ending in a roof cornice with balustrade, indicate neo-Renaissance and neo-Baroque models. The original design's heraldic and sculptural decorations were not executed. The only plastic ornaments are medallions with images of Pericles, Athena, Demosthenes and Cicero, by sculptor Đorđe Jovanović, on the lateral risalits. A sculpture above the portals of an angel with a torch and an olive branch was designed by sculptor Petar Palavičini. A 1937 fence with decorative candelabras and two guardrooms with stylized lanterns on top was designed by Krasnov; the fence stood until 1956, when it was removed for Marx and Engels Square (now Nikola Pašić Square). In 1939 a sculptural group by Toma Rosandić, Black Horses Playing, was installed near the steps. 

Interior design includes large and small halls and conference rooms, a central vestibule topped by a dome, polychrome walls with columns, pilasters, niches and loggias and a marble floor. The Assembly Hall, designed to hold 200 people, was expanded to accommodate 400.

Krasnov's furniture designs reflect contemporary Belgrade tastes. The walls of the Assembly are adorned with twenty frescoes, made during 1937 by prominent Yugoslav artists. Because of its architectural, cultural, historical and artistic value, the National Assembly Building was declared a cultural monument in 1984.

Former building
Before 2006, the National Assembly of Serbia met in another parliament building on Kralja Milana Street while its current building was used by the Federal Assembly of Yugoslavia. The parliament building is still used by the national assembly for offices and administration.

The design for this building was completed in 1948, and its construction was completed in late 1953. It was designed by architect E. Azriel and built by the Construction Institute of Serbia. The building was known as the Office Building of the Presidency of the Government of the People's Republic of Serbia at Marshal Tito Street (later renamed Kralja Milana Street). The first National Assembly session in the building was held on 20 March 1954; from 1945 to 1954, National Assembly sessions were held at the House of the National Assembly on Nikola Pašić Square.

Gallery

References

External links

 
 Virtual tour
 The National Assembly Artwork

1936 establishments in Yugoslavia
Buildings and structures completed in 1936
Buildings and structures in Belgrade
Legislative buildings in Europe
Seats of national legislatures